Legislature of Libya may refer to:

Lower house of Kingdom of Libya, Chamber of Deputies, 1951–1969
Upper house of Kingdom of Libya, Senate, 1951–1969

General People's Congress (Libya), 1977–2011
National Transitional Council, 2011–2012
General National Congress, 2012–2016
New General National Congress
House of Representatives (Libya), since 2014
High Council of State (Libya), since 2016